The Christmas Island Resort, often called the Christmas Island Casino, is a holiday resort on Christmas Island, an Australian territory in the north-eastern Indian Ocean lying about 300 km south of Java and 1600 km north-west of the Australian mainland.  It operated as a casino for over four years during the 1990s. It was one of the world's most profitable prior to bankruptcy and generated over $5 billion a year profits.

History
The casino/resort was conceived in the early 1980s by Perth property developer Frank Woodmore as a business opportunity following the closure in 1981, for political reasons, of Indonesia's three licensed casinos, all of which were in Jakarta. With Jakarta less than an hour's flight from Christmas Island, the casino was intended to attract high rollers from Indonesia and other Asian countries.

In 1985 a company, Christmas Island Resort Pty Ltd (CIR) was incorporated, with Woodmore, through Mercator Property Consultants Pty Ltd, initially holding 10% of the share capital, with other interests, principally controlled by Indonesian businessman Robby Sumampow, acquiring the remainder. Construction of the resort began late in the 1980s. On 5 November 1993 CIR was granted an Australian casino licence, with the building complex formally opened as the Christmas Island Casino and Resort on 18 December 1993.

As envisaged, the casino catered mainly to a wealthy Asian clientele, with most of its patrons flying in from Jakarta, often by private jet. Business was facilitated by the Australian government, which issued special short-term visas for Christmas Island. Initially the resort operated profitably, with most revenue coming from the casino. However, after 1994, CIR made losses. The resort was badly affected by the Asian Financial Crisis of 1997-98, and it suspended operations on 23 April 1998. On 28 July 1998 the Australian Minister for Regional Development, Territories and Local Government cancelled CIR's casino licence and, the following day, the company went into receivership. In 2000, the resort was purchased from the liquidators by David Kwon, a Sydney-based businessman.

In July 2004 a proposal by KFL Star Resort, a consortium of South Korean investors registered in Perth, to reopen the casino was rejected by the Australian Government, with the Minister for Local Government, Territories and Roads, Senator Ian Campbell, quoted as saying that in the "interests of the Christmas Island community, the Australian Government has decided to make legislative changes to prohibit casino operations".  In July 2009 it was reported that the Australian Federal Government was negotiating with Kwon about using the resort facilities to relieve overcrowding at the island's Immigration Detention Centre because of increases in boatloads of asylum seekers attempting to reach Australia.  In response, the island's Shire President, Gordon Thomson, said that the Australian government should take control of the then mothballed resort and hand it over to the Christmas Island community to operate as a tourist resort.

In 2013, Kwon started negotiations with the Australian government for the possibility to lease the resort as a viable solution to the island's growing economic needs.

Description
The resort lies on a 47 ha block of land, a 99-year crown lease issued in 1989, at Waterfall Bay on the north-eastern coastal terraces of the island, not far from the airport.  It contains 156 guest rooms and suites as well as other resort facilities such as restaurants, nightclubs and a swimming pool.  When it operated as a casino the facilities included 43 slot machines and 23 gambling tables.  CIR also owned the Christmas Island Lodge, containing 80 motel-style rooms, in Poon Saan as well as 144 apartments for staff accommodation.

It has 156 fully furnished hotel rooms of which 52 are two-storey suites with ocean views. One of its two modern kitchens was leased by the government in 2002 to provide meals for asylum seekers.

Notes

Sources

External links
 Christmas Island Resort
 Four Corners: The Christmas Party
Will Christmas Island get its casino back?

Casinos in Australia
Organisations based in Christmas Island
Casinos completed in 1993
Defunct casinos
1993 establishments in Australia